Pind Kargoo Khan is one of the 51 union councils of Abbottabad District in Khyber-Pakhtunkhwa province of Pakistan. It is located 30 km from Abbottabad city.

References

Union councils of Abbottabad District